David Tweedie may refer to:
David Tweedie (accountant) (born 1944), Scottish accountant who served as chairman of the International Accounting Standards Board
Dave Tweedie (born 1968), American composer, multi-instrumentalist and record producer
David Tweedie (mathematician) (1865–1934), Scottish mathematician who taught in Egypt
David J. Tweedie (1870–1926), Scottish mathematician